Sanat Shikhov (born 28 December 1989) is a Uzbekistani football midfielder and left back who currently plays for Sogdiana Jizzakh. He was a squad member for the 2009 FIFA U-20 World Cup.

References

1989 births
Living people
Uzbekistani footballers
Pakhtakor Tashkent FK players
FC Qizilqum Zarafshon players
FK Dinamo Samarqand players
Navbahor Namangan players
Buxoro FK players
FC AGMK players
FC Sogdiana Jizzakh players
Uzbekistan youth international footballers
Uzbekistan under-21 international footballers
Uzbekistan international footballers
Association football midfielders